Wamberto de Jesus Sousa Campos (born 13 December 1974) is a Brazilian former footballer who last played as a forward and as a midfielder. He notably represented AFC Ajax and Standard Liége.

He was also nicknamed Wampie by Ajax supporters.

Biography
Wamberto played for R.F.C. Seraing and Standard Liège in Belgium and Ajax Amsterdam in Netherlands. The tricky and illusive player established himself in Belgium between 1993 and 1998 before joining Ajax in August 1998. He is famously remembered for scoring the equaliser in offside position against FC Utrecht in the 2002 Dutch Cup final which eventually was won by Ajax in the extra time. In January 2004, he was loaned to Belgian club Mons for 18 months who also retained the first option to buy him. But Mons failed to protect their place in top division, and saw Wamberto join Standard Liège on summer of 2004 on a 2-year contract, but he rejoined the newly promoted Mons on a free transfer in summer 2006. He was released after a year, and returned to the Netherlands, joining FC Omniworld.

His eldest son Danilo Sousa Campos is also a professional footballer, having played for Standard Liège and Metalurh Donetsk after a formation period in the AFC Ajax academy. His younger son Wanderson is also a footballer currently playing for FC Krasnodar.

References

External links
 
 
 Brazilian FA Database 

1974 births
Living people
Sportspeople from Maranhão
Association football midfielders
Brazilian footballers
R.F.C. Seraing (1904) players
Standard Liège players
AFC Ajax players
R.A.E.C. Mons players
Almere City FC players
Belgian Pro League players
Eredivisie players
Eerste Divisie players
Brazilian expatriate footballers
Expatriate footballers in Belgium
Brazilian expatriate sportspeople in Belgium
Expatriate footballers in the Netherlands
Brazilian expatriate sportspeople in the Netherlands